The Spectrum is the student-run newspaper of North Dakota State University in Fargo, North Dakota. The Spectrum has been in publication since 1896.

Over the years, The Spectrum has performed well in the Associated Collegiate Press Best of the Midwest competition in Minneapolis, MN with its most recent showing saw wins for “Best of Show” award in the four-year weekly newspaper category and “Best of Show” award for its website, large-school category in 2016.

Its oversight committee is the Board of Student Publications (BOSP) made up of a rotating group of four faculty members and five students and receives a portion of the student activity fee as a means to subsidize its production. The Board Of Student Publications is also responsible for hiring and firing the editor in chief.

References

External links
The Spectrum website

North Dakota State University
Newspapers published in North Dakota
Publications established in 1896
1896 establishments in North Dakota